Osmar Olvera Ibarra (born 5 June 2004) is a Mexican diver. He was the youngest diver in the Mexican diving team in the 2020 Summer Olympics.

He won six gold medals at the 2019  (National Olympics).

References 

Living people
2004 births
Mexican male divers
Sportspeople from Jalisco
Olympic divers of Mexico
Divers at the 2020 Summer Olympics
21st-century Mexican people